Cambio de Piel is the second studio album and major label debut by Chilean singer-songwriter Denise Rosenthal. It was released on December 6, 2017 by Universal Music Chile. It was preceded by two singles, the lead-single of the same name and the ballad "Isidora".

Release 
The album was released on December 6, 2017.

Singles 
"Cambio de Piel" was released as the album's lead-single on November 25, 2016. Its music video, was released on December 6, 2016.

"Isidora" was released as the second single from the album on September 1, 2017. Its music video, was released on August 31, 2017. It was directed by Claudia Huaiquimilla.

"Cabello de Ángel" was released as the third single from the album on January 25, 2018. A music video was released on the same day and shows the singer dancing in different places and singing in front of a blue background wearing a flower crown.

"Lucha en Equilibrio" was announced as a single on early June by the singer during a live performance in tv.

Track listing 
Credits adapted from qobuz.com

Certifications

References 

2017 albums
Spanish-language albums
Denise Rosenthal albums